Akoon Aw La (lit. “To Be or Not to Be”) is a Bahraini television series directed by Aly Al Aly and written by Hussain al-Mahdi.

Synopsis
In a small village on the outskirts of a city in the 1990s, forty-something woman Amna’s husband dies of a terminal illness. She decides to continue in his line of work and raises their sons, the benevolent Salem and the wily Aziz. She Amna also takes in her niece Khadija after the death of her wealthy merchant father, leading Aziz to seduce his cousin for her fortune. When Amna has Salem marry Khadija instead, Aziz concocts schemes to discredit Khadija. They are foiled, and Aziz is arrested and imprisoned with his accomplice, the mukhtar (village elder) Sheikh Abdul Malik.

Cast
 Basma Hamada as Amna
 Khaled Amin as Aziz ibn Amna
 Hamad Al Omani as Salem ibn Amna
 Somoud Alkandari as Saja, niece of Amna
 Buthaina Al Raisi as Khadija, niece of Amna
 Salah Al-Mulla as Mustapha
 Ibrahim Al-Hsawi as Sheikh Abdul Malik
 Aseel Omran as Soraya
 Laila Abdullah as Radia
 Ahmed Issa as Hamza
 Shamaa Mohammed as Soraya’s mother
 Mubarak Khamis as Hamed
 Sami Rashdan as Fathy
 Samira Al Wahaibi as Salma
 Shayma Janahi as Bashayer
 Shaima Sabt as Iman
 Amina Al Qafaas
 Ali Al-Jabri as Abu Halala
 Hussain Al-Jamri as Majid
 Muhammad Al-Saffar as Sheikh Hani

References

External links
 El Cinema page

Bahraini television series
2012 television series debuts
2012 television series endings